The canton of Le Perche is an administrative division of the Loir-et-Cher department, central France. It was created at the French canton reorganisation which came into effect in March 2015. Its seat is in Savigny-sur-Braye.

It consists of the following communes:
 
Baillou
Beauchêne
Bonneveau
Bouffry
Boursay
Brévainville
Busloup
Cellé
La Chapelle-Enchérie
La Chapelle-Vicomtesse
Chauvigny-du-Perche
Choue
Cormenon
Couëtron-au-Perche
Danzé
Droué
Épuisay
Fontaine-les-Coteaux
Fontaine-Raoul
La Fontenelle
Fortan
Fréteval
Le Gault-du-Perche
Lignières
Lisle
Moisy
Mondoubleau
Morée
Ouzouer-le-Doyen
Pezou
Le Plessis-Dorin
Le Poislay
Rahart
Renay
Romilly
Ruan-sur-Egvonne
Saint-Firmin-des-Prés
Saint-Hilaire-la-Gravelle
Saint-Jean-Froidmentel
Saint-Marc-du-Cor
Sargé-sur-Braye
Savigny-sur-Braye
Sougé
Le Temple
La Ville-aux-Clercs
Villebout

References

Cantons of Loir-et-Cher